Cara Black and Lisa Raymond were the defending champions, but only Raymond decided to compete in 2011. She partnered up with Liezel Huber, but they were eliminated in the semifinals by Sara Errani and Roberta Vinci.

Olga Govortsova and Alla Kudryavtseva defeated Errani and Vinci in the final 1–6, 6–1, [10–5].

Seeds

Draw

References 
 2011 DFS Classic draws
 ITF tournament page

Aegon Classic - Doubles
Doubles

bg:АЕГОН Класик 2011
ca:AEGON Classic 2011
cs:AEGON Classic 2011
de:AEGON Classic 2011
fr:Classic de Birmingham 2011
nl:WTA-toernooi van Birmingham 2011
pl:AEGON Classic 2011